Myrtle Lake is a freshwater lake located on the northern slope of Big Snow Mountain between Snoqualmie Lake and Chetwoot Lake, in King County, Washington. Self-issued Alpine Lake Wilderness permit required for transit within the Big Snow Mountain area. Because Myrtle Lake is at the heart of the Alpine Lakes Wilderness, the lake is a popular area for hiking, swimming, and fishing rainbow trout and coastal cutthroat trout.

The input for Myrtle Lake is from Little Myrtle Lake, less than a mile distance to the north. Big Snow Lake is also a short distance from Myrtle Lake, to the East while Little Bulger Ridge overshadows off the northwest shore of Myrtle Lake.

Location
Myrtle lake is surrounded by alpine lakes north of Big Snow Mountain. Access is from Dingford Creek trail off Middle Fork Trail 1003 in the heart of the Middle Fork valley, past the open-air cabana at the Goldmeyer Hot Springs pools and past the junction to Hester Lake.

See also 
 List of lakes of the Alpine Lakes Wilderness

References 

Lakes of King County, Washington
Lakes of the Alpine Lakes Wilderness
Okanogan National Forest